The presidential standard of India was a flag flown by the president of India from 1950 to 1971. It succeeded the flag of the governor-general of India (used during the 1947–1950 period of the Dominion of India) on 26 January 1950, when India became a republic. It ceased being used on 15 August 1971, when the president began using the national flag of India.

Description
The standard was a rectangle divided quarterly into blue and red quadrants. Each quadrant was occupied by a national symbols drawn in gold outline. The symbols were:
 1st quarter: The Lion Capital of Ashoka, which is the State Emblem of India, to represent unity;
 2nd quarter: A lively Indian elephant from a 5th-century painting of Ajanta Caves, Maharashtra to represent patience and strength;
 3rd quarter: A weighing scale from the 17th-century Red Fort, Delhi, to represent justice and economy;
 4th quarter: A vase of Indian lotus from Sarnath, Uttar Pradesh to represent prosperity.

Related flags

See also 
 President of India
 Indian flags

References

Flags introduced in 1950
Flags of India
Flags displaying animals